Sodium cocoate is a mixture of fatty acid salts (acid salts) of coconut oil that is used in some soaps.

Sodium cocoate is produced by hydrolysis of the ester linkages in coconut oil with sodium hydroxide, a strong base.

References

See also

 Sodium laurate
 Sodium myristate
 Sodium tallowate

Organic sodium salts